The Men's team sprint competition at the 2021 UCI Track Cycling World Championships was held on 20 October 2021.

Results

Qualifying
The qualifying was started at 18:52. The best eight teams advanced to the first round.

First round
First round heats were held as follows:
Heat 1: 4th v 5th fastest
Heat 2: 3rd v 6th fastest
Heat 3: 2nd v 7th fastest
Heat 4: 1st v 8th fastest

The first round was started at 20:04. The heat winners were ranked on time, from which the top two advanced to the gold medal race and the other two proceeded to the bronze medal race.

Finals
The finals were started at 20:59.

See also
2021 UCI Track Cycling World Championships – Women's team sprint

References

Men's team sprint
UCI Track Cycling World Championships – Men's team sprint